The Church of the Saviour (Naós tou Sotíros) is a 14th-century Byzantine chapel in Thessaloniki, Greece. It is a UNESCO World Heritage Site as one of the Paleochristian and Byzantine monuments of Thessaloniki. The church has been dated to about 1350, based on a coin found within its dome during archaeological investigations and restoration work following the 1978 Thessaloniki earthquake.

References

Byzantine church buildings in Thessaloniki
World Heritage Sites in Greece
14th-century architecture in Greece